Antoni Nicolau i Parera (8 June 1858 — 26 February 1933) was a Spanish composer from Catalonia.

Life
Nicolau was born and died in Barcelona. He was a student of Juan Bautista Pujol.

Works, editions and recordings
 Raïms i espigues. Cançó de la Moreneta on Jacint Verdaguer i el lied català. M. Teresa Garrigosa, soprano ; Emili Blasco, piano La mà de Guido, 2005.

References

External links

1858 births
1933 deaths
19th-century classical composers
19th-century Spanish male musicians
20th-century classical composers
20th-century Spanish male musicians
20th-century Spanish musicians
Composers from Catalonia
Spanish classical composers
Spanish male classical composers
Spanish Romantic composers